Amlin is an unincorporated community in southwestern Washington Township, Franklin County, Ohio, United States.  It has a post office with the ZIP code 43002.

History
Amlin was laid out in 1847 by Zeloria E. Amlin, and named for him after starting a farm at Amlin Station.

References

Unincorporated communities in Franklin County, Ohio
Unincorporated communities in Ohio